Obstacle racing was among the sports contested at the 2019 Southeast Asian Games. Six obstacle course racing events were featured: two events each for 100 meters with 10 obstacles, 400 meters with 12 obstacles and 5 km with 20 obstacles. These were the first obstacle course racing events in Games recognised by the International Olympic Committee and under regulation of World OCR, the Fédération Internationale de Sport d'Obstacles.

Schedule

Source: 2019 Sea Games

Venue
The venue for obstacle racing in the 2019 Southeast Asian Games was in Spectrum Midway Avenue. in Filinvest City, in Muntinlupa, Metro Manila. Obstacle racing was originally planned to be hosted in the Subic area. The Subic Bay Freeport Zone previously hosted the Spartan Race, an obstacle race sports event. The plan was later changed to host obstacle racing at the University of the Philippines Diliman's Sunken Garden however the university raised concern regarding the noise pollution and heavy traffic it would cause in its campus during the duration of the sporting event.

Participating nations
Six nations expressed intention to participate in the event. Four nations medaled, Philippines (16), Malaysia (10), Indonesia (9) and Laos (2)

Medal summary

Medal table

Medalists

References

External links
 

Obstacle racing
Southeast Asian Games 2019
2019 Southeast Asian Games events